Valley of Vengeance is a 1944 American Western film directed by Sam Newfield and written by Joseph O'Donnell. The film stars Buster Crabbe, Al St. John, Evelyn Finley, Donald Mayo, David Polonsky and Glenn Strange. The film was released on May 5, 1944, by Producers Releasing Corporation.

Plot

Cast          
Buster Crabbe as Billy Carson
Al St. John as Fuzzy Jones 
Evelyn Finley as Helen Miller
Donald Mayo as Billy 
David Polonsky as Fuzzy 
Glenn Strange as Marshal Barker
Charles King as Burke
John Merton as Burt
Lynton Brent as David Carr
Jack Ingram as King Brett
Bud Osborne as Dad Carson
Nora Bush as Mom Carson
Steve Clark as Hap

See also
The "Billy the Kid" films starring Buster Crabbe: 
 Billy the Kid Wanted (1941)
 Billy the Kid's Round-Up (1941)
 Billy the Kid Trapped (1942)
 Billy the Kid's Smoking Guns (1942)
 Law and Order (1942) 
 Sheriff of Sage Valley (1942) 
 The Mysterious Rider (1942)
 The Kid Rides Again (1943)
 Fugitive of the Plains (1943)
 Western Cyclone (1943)
 Cattle Stampede (1943)
 The Renegade (1943)
 Blazing Frontier (1943)
 Devil Riders (1943)
 Frontier Outlaws (1944)
 Valley of Vengeance (1944)
 The Drifter (1944) 
 Fuzzy Settles Down (1944)
 Rustlers' Hideout (1944)
 Wild Horse Phantom (1944)
 Oath of Vengeance (1944)
 His Brother's Ghost (1945) 
 Thundering Gunslingers (1945)
 Shadows of Death (1945)
 Gangster's Den (1945)
 Stagecoach Outlaws (1945)
 Border Badmen (1945)
 Fighting Bill Carson (1945)
 Prairie Rustlers (1945) 
 Lightning Raiders (1945)
 Terrors on Horseback (1946)
 Gentlemen with Guns (1946)
 Ghost of Hidden Valley (1946)
 Prairie Badmen (1946)
 Overland Riders (1946)
 Outlaws of the Plains (1946)

References

External links
 

1944 films
American Western (genre) films
1944 Western (genre) films
Producers Releasing Corporation films
Films directed by Sam Newfield
American black-and-white films
1940s English-language films
1940s American films